Ditaola Ditaola (born 23 August 1978) is a Botswana footballer who plays as a striker for Police XI. He played for the Botswana national football team between 1998 and 2002.

External links
 

Association football midfielders
Botswana footballers
Botswana international footballers
1978 births
Living people
Botswana Police XI SC players